The 2014–15 1. FC Nürnberg season is the 115th season in the club's football history.

Review and events
In 2014–15 the club plays in the 2. Bundesliga.

The club also took part in the 2014–15 edition of the DFB-Pokal, the German Cup, where it was knocked out by 3. Liga side MSV Duisburg, losing 0–1.

Matches

Legend

Friendly matches

DFB-Pokal

Bundesliga

League results and fixtures

Current league table

Overall

Sources

External links
 2014–15 1. FC Nürnberg season at Weltfussball.de 
 2014–15 1. FC Nürnberg season at kicker.de 
 2014–15 1. FC Nürnberg season at Fussballdaten.de 

Nuremberg
1. FC Nürnberg seasons